George Bossy (May 21, 1927 – October 29, 2012) was a Canadian sprint canoer who competed in the 1950s. Competing in two Summer Olympics, he earned his best finish of eighth in the C-1 1000 m event at Melbourne in 1956. Having moved to Montreal when he was young, Bossy was drafted by the Montreal Alouettes in 1952 out of McGill University and played one game with the Alouettes in 1952.

He died in San Jose del Cabo, Mexico on October 29, 2012. He is the uncle of Mike Bossy, a member of the hockey hall of fame.

References

1927 births
2012 deaths
Canadian male canoeists
Canoeists at the 1952 Summer Olympics
Canoeists at the 1956 Summer Olympics
Olympic canoeists of Canada
Sportspeople from Winnipeg
Canoeists from Montreal
Players of Canadian football from Manitoba
Players of Canadian football from Quebec
McGill Redbirds football players
Montreal Alouettes players
Canadian people of Ukrainian descent